Rabbit God K was one of two known rulers of Ixkun, Mayan city. He was a successor of Eight Skull. His mother was Lady Ik.

Stelae record the visit of Ch'iyel, king of Sacul, to Ixkun on 11 October 790, when Rabbit God K ruled.

Around AD 800 Rabbit God K erected the last sculpted monument at the city and was preparing new construction projects, with construction material piled ready for use in various places in the site core, however these projects were never finished.

Notes

References
 

Kings of Ixkun
8th century in Guatemala